This is a list of shipwrecks located in the United Kingdom.

England

Northern Ireland

Scotland

Wales

References

External links

 United Kingdom
Shipwrecks of the United Kingdom